Gilkash District was a district (bakhsh) in Minudasht County, Golestan Province, Iran. At the 2006 census, its population was 57,404, in 13,706 families.  The District had one city: Galikash.  The District had three rural districts (dehestan): Nilkuh Rural District, Qaravolan Rural District, and Yanqaq Rural District. The District created a county in 2010: Galikash County.

References 

Former districts of Golestan Province
Minudasht County
Galikash County